Bank Saint Petersburg is a Russian bank created in 1990 in Saint Petersburg. According to the bank website, Saint Petersburg Bank is mostly implemented in Northwest Russia. The bank is listed on Moscow Exchange.
Located in Saint Petersburg and the Leningrad region, Alexander Savelyev is the chairman of the bank's management board.

History 
It was established on 3 October 1990 as a joint-stock company Lenbank, a year later it received its current name. In June 1998, St. Petersburg was the first among city banks to receive permission from the Central Bank of Russia to issue cash from card accounts.

In the fall of 2007, St. Petersburg was the first private bank in Russia that did IPO, received permission from the Federal Financial Markets Service to issue receipts, but further, refused listing on the foreign stock exchange (receipts were converted into ordinary shares that are now in circulation in the several number of Russian stock exchanges).

As of January 1, 2018, the bank served 1.93 million individuals and 50 thousand companies.

Sanctions 
Bank Saint Petersburg was sanctioned by the United States and the United Kingdom on 24 February 2023 in relation to the 2022 Russian invasion of Ukraine.

Leadership 
On 10/01/2016:
 Chairman of the Supervisory Board: Elena Ivannikova
 Chairman of the Board: Alexander Saveliev

Financial indicators 
According to the preliminary activities results in 2017 according to RAS, the bank had the following financial indicators:

References

External links
 Official Website

Banks of Russia
Companies based in Saint Petersburg
Banks established in 1990
Companies listed on the Moscow Exchange
1990 establishments in Russia
Russian brands